The qualification event of the 2012 World Wheelchair Curling Championship was held from November 5 to 10, 2011 at the Kisakallio Sports Institute in Lohja, Finland, which hosted the qualification event for last year's World Wheelchair Championships. The event's two top finishers, Slovakia and Italy, qualified for the main tournament in Chuncheon City, South Korea.

The two qualification spots were determined as follows: The nine teams played each other once in the round-robin. At the conclusion of the round robin, the top four teams advanced to the playoffs. Tie-break games were necessary to decide on the top four teams. The playoffs followed the first and second rounds of the page playoff system. In the first round of playoffs, the first seed played the second seed and the third seed played the fourth seed. The winner of the 1 vs. 2 game, Slovakia, qualified for the World Championships, while the loser of the 1 vs. 2 game, Italy, played the winner of the 3 vs. 4 game, Finland, in the Second Place Game. The winner of the Second Place Game, Italy, qualified to the World Championships.

Teams

Round-robin standings
Final round-robin standings

Round-robin results

Draw 1
Saturday, November 5, 16:00

 receives a bye this round.

Draw 2
Sunday, November 6, 10:30

 receives a bye this round.

Draw 3
Sunday, November 6, 16:30

 receives a bye this round.

Draw 4
Monday, November 7, 10:30

 receives a bye this round.

Draw 5
Monday, November 7, 16:30

 receives a bye this round.

Draw 6
Tuesday, November 8, 10:30

 receives a bye this round.

Draw 7
Tuesday, November 8, 16:30

 receives a bye this round.

Draw 8
Wednesday, November 9, 9:00

 receives a bye this round.

Draw 9
Wednesday, November 9, 14:30

 receives a bye this round.

Tiebreakers
Wednesday, November 9, 19:00

Playoffs

1 vs. 2
Thursday, November 10, 10:30

 is qualified to participate in the Worlds
 moves to Second Place Game

3 vs. 4
Thursday, November 10, 10:30

 advances to Second Place Game

Second Place Game
Thursday, November 10, 16:30

 qualified to participate in the Worlds

References
General

Specific

External links

2011 in curling
World Wheelchair Curling Championship
World Wheelchair Curling Championship - Qualification Event
Qualification for curling competitions
International curling competitions hosted by Finland